Sea Fury is a 1958 British action film directed by Cy Endfield and starring Stanley Baker, Victor McLaglen (in his final film), Luciana Paluzzi and Grégoire Aslan.

It was the last film appearance from Victor McLaglen.

Plot
A qualified First Mate Abel Hewson arrives in a Spanish seaside town looking for work on local ships salvaging still afloat abandoned ships. Abel Hewson and Captain Bellew become love rivals for 18 years old Josita. Both men go on a dangerous mission to salvage a floating wreck carrying explosives which will detonate on contact with any water, on which this rivalry comes between them and their work. The tug-boat crew also resent Abel Hewson being made their First Mate, especially Gorman. They are also competing against another tug-boat operator Captain Mulder for the salvage prize.

Cast
 Stanley Baker – Abel Hewson
 Victor McLaglen – Captain Bellew
 Luciana Paluzzi – Josita
 Grégoire Aslan – Fernando
 Francis de Wolff – Mulder
 David Oxley – Blanco
 George Murcell – Loudon
 Percy Herbert – Walker
 Rupert Davies – Bosun
 Robert Shaw – Gorman
 Roger Delgado – Salgado
 Barry Foster – Vincent
 Joe Robinson – Henrik
 Dermot Walsh – Captain Kelso
 Richard Pearson – Kershaw
 Fred Johnson – Doc
 Jack Taylor – Donkeyman

Production
Victor McLaglen was cast with a view to the American market. He signed in February 1958.

Stanley Baker and Cy Endfield had previously teamed on Hell Drivers.

The film was shot in Costa Brava, where Rank had filmed The Spanish Garden. Filming finished 3 April 1958 at Pinewood Studios.

Critical reception
Variety called it "entertaining".

Sky Movies wrote, "A host of good actors, including Robert Shaw and Barry Foster, add meat to the minor roles in this tough action film."

References

External links

Sea Fury at TCMDB
Sea Fury at BFI

1958 films
Films directed by Cy Endfield
1958 adventure films
Films shot at Pinewood Studios
Films set in Spain
Seafaring films
British adventure films
1950s English-language films
1950s British films